{{Infobox animanga/Print
| type        = manga
| title       = Amagi Brilliant Park? Fumo
| author      = Shoji Gatoh
| illustrator = Kōji Azuma
| publisher   = Fujimi Shobo
| demographic = Shōnen
| magazine    = Monthly Dragon Age (June 2014 – November 2015 issues) 
 Dragon Magazine (July 2014 – September 2015 issues)
| first       = May 9, 2014
| last        = October 9, 2015 
| volumes     = 2
| volume_list = 
}}

 is a Japanese light novel series written by Shoji Gatoh and illustrated by Yuka Nakajima. Fujimi Shobo has published eight volumes since February 20, 2013, under their Fujimi Fantasia Bunko imprint. J-Novel Club has licensed the series for an English release, with the first volume released digitally on September 9, 2018. There are three manga adaptations published by Fujimi Shobo and Kadokawa. A 13-episode anime television series adaptation by Kyoto Animation aired in Japan between October 6 and December 25, 2014.

Plot
Seiya Kanie is a good-looking, perfectionist boy who is forced by the mysterious Isuzu Sento to visit an amusement park named Amagi Brilliant Park, which is in serious financial trouble and about to be closed forever. The park is actually staffed by refugees from a magical realm called Maple Land and the park is a facility for harvesting magical energy from visitors while they're having fun. As such, the park is the only way the refugees can maintain their existence in the human realm.

To save the park from closing, Seiya is hired by the owner, Latifah Fleuranza, the princess of Maple Land (whom Seiya met before when he was a young boy), to become its new manager and use his skills in entertainment to save it. However, they have only two weeks to attract 100,000 visitors (they have to attract 250,000 visitors in three months in the anime version), a feat that seems impossible given the park's current situation.

Characters
Main characters

Seiya is a perfectionist high school student who is extremely intelligent, has excellent reflexes, and acts like a prince to the point of being a narcissist which annoys people. As a child, he was involved in the entertainment industry and his stage name was Seiya Kodama. According to Isuzu, he was a child who would have made any parent proud. However, Seiya has told her that persona died a long time ago. Latifah grants him the magical power of listening to a person's heart, although it only works once with each person. After some time, he opens up to the park's workers, especially Isuzu, with whom he shares his fears and insecurities, which encourages Isuzu when she was disappointed of herself. He once met Latifah when he was a kid, but he didn't remember until he found out about her curse. His name originates from Kanye West.

A royal guard who forces Seiya (at gunpoint) to go on a "date" with her to Amagi Brilliant Park. She has a stoic personality, rarely showing emotion. Despite that facade, she is also very sensitive. She managed Amagi Brilliant Park before Seiya's arrival, but she was a poor manager due to her upbringing as a royal guard and her fearsome reputation among the staff. Once Seiya takes over as manager, Isuzu serves as his secretary. After meeting Seiya, her personality slowly changes and she eventually develops feelings for him but refuses to tell him. Isuzu carries a magical muzzleloader named Steinberger that has been magically infused into her body, so she can summon it from any exposed skin. With it she fires bullets with different effects such as removing the target's memory or simply causing a lot of pain. Her name originates from 50 Cent.

The princess of Maple Land. She gives Seiya some of her magical powers by kissing him. According to Triken, she is Moffle's niece and bears a striking resemblance to his sister. Due to her frail body as well as other circumstances, she cannot leave her garden, which is surrounded by a magic barrier. In the light novel, Latifah is blind. It is later revealed that a wizard cursed her, making her body deficient in Animus, Maple Land's life force. The curse renews each year, resetting her memory and age, meaning she has lived as a 14-year-old for more than a decade. It is heavily implied that she also has a feelings for Seiya. Her name originates from Queen Latifah.

Amagi Brilliant Park cast

Mascots

A mouse-like sweets fairy who is Amagi Brilliant Park's main mascot, who takes a mutual dislike towards Seiya. He is Latifah's uncle and is very protective of her. He hates being called a knockoff of Bonta, resembling the fictional mascot of the Full Metal Panic? Fumoffu series (animated at the same studio, Kyoto Animation, and based on a light novel by the same author, Shoji Gatoh). It is hinted, albeit indirectly, that Moffle hates Latifah's father due to his marriage to Moffle's beloved sister and that Latifah was merely left in his care.

 
A sheep-like magic fairy who is one of the park's mascots, a short tempered artist who often takes time off work if he is not feeling inspired. He plays the violin. He's divorced and fighting for the custody of his daughter.

A pink cat-like flower fairy who is a flirty pervert with a keen eye for young women and bewitching older women and well-versed in explosives.

 
A fairy with the form of a blue crocodile who is one of the park's mascots, though he barely has a fanbase compared to the other Mascots.

 
A ferret-like flower fairy who was assumed dead by the others after ending up trapped in the "Ruby's Trial by Fire" attraction looking for a treasure ten years prior, becoming a shut-in otaku who spends his time watching anime and playing online games. When the group venture learn the truth while attempting to get the treasure, they sold off Dornell's collection to get the money needed to maintain the park.

 
A shark-like fairy who works the machine room. He becomes a terrifying life-like version of himself when he comes into contact with water; an ability he himself was not aware of until Seiya showed him his reflection in a mirror, much to his shock. He later becomes Tetsuhige's supervisor and uses the pirate's sharkphobia to keep him and his crew in line.

Elementario

 
The fairy of water and the leader of the fairies of Elementario. Muse has a very energetic and cheerful personality and she is often seen with a smile on her face. Despite the lack of popularity of the Elementario, she still works hard. Of the four fairies, she is the best at singing.

 
The fairy of wind of the fairies of Elementario. She is an airhead, but also the best at performing of the four. She sometimes speaks random Chinese sayings.

 
The fairy of earth of the fairies of Elementario. She usually has a stoic demeanor and has shown interest in yaoi. She is shown to be a complete klutz.

 
The fairy of fire of the fairies of Elementario, who usually has a lazy and unmotivated personality when it comes to performing at the park. She seems to enjoy being on her phone when she is not performing and apparently engages in flaming wars.

Other members

 
A fairy with the form of a yellow triceratops with glasses and perverted personality. He is in charge of sales and advertisizing.

 
The head accountant of Amagi Brilliant Park.

 
A fairy with the form of a wrench. He is the chief of engineering.

 
The chief of security of Amagi Brilliant Park. A regular human who wears a wrestler mask.

 
A fairy with the form of several types of meat, who is the head of catering.

 
A fairy with the form of a dolphin wearing samurai gear who is in charge of the Splash Ocean attraction.

 
A huge red dragon that lived in the abandoned "Ruby's Trial by Fire" attraction at the park, but later he was re-hired to work on another attraction. Despite his size and appearance, he's quite a crybaby, and not very good at flying, but works hard nonetheless.

 
The leader of the Diggeries, a group of mole-like fairies who were being persecuted by a tyrannical empire, so they were given shelter in the park. After finding out said empire was no more, they gleefully accept to work at the park.

 
A girl with a kind demeanor who used to work in AV (animal videos) and is hired in order to compensate the lack of staff by Seiya. She is capable of understanding what the mascots are saying when they are not speaking.

 
Another girl who is also hired in order to compensate the lack of staff by Seiya, but showed up at the interview after being stabbed by her brother, simply because, he refuses to let his younger sister go to work. She works in the shaved ice stand near the pool area.

 
A shy and timid girl coming from Amagi High, a year younger than Isuzu and Kanie, who is the last person hired in order to compensate the lack of staff by Seiya. She works with Jaw in the machine room. She seems to have a crush on Kanie.

 
A pirate from Maple Land with the form of an elephant seal with an iron mustache. He and his crew of pirate seals appeared at the Splash Ocean attraction when a magic portal opened there and took Latifah, the customers and the cast as hostages. After being defeated, he and his crew are forced to work at the park in order to pay for the damages under the supervision of Jaw (as they are terrified of sharks). He later warms up to the idea of being an entertainer and even begins to enjoy his role to entertain children.

Other characters

 
Takaya is the wizard who defeated a powerful dragon under orders of the king of Maple Land with the promise of gaining Latifah's hand in return, but when the king refused to fulfill his part of the bargain, he placed a curse on the princess, leading to her current condition. He later appears disguised as an employee of Amagi Development, a company that wishes to acquire Amagi Brilliant Park. He is named after Chris Tucker.

 
Seiya's aunt and guardian. Despite usually slacking off, she deeply cares about her nephew,she is named after Ice Cube.

 
A waitress that works at the restaurant "Savage", that is frequented by Moffle, Macaron and Tirami.

Classmate of Tsuchida who is accusing Kanie (actually the mascots) for playing Tsuchida's affections.

Girlfriend of Kimura and classmates of Terano. She intended to send a love letter to Kimura which accidentally sent to Seiya.

Boyfriend of Kanae Tsuchida.

Media
Light novels
The first light novel volume was published by Fujimi Shobo under their Fujimi Fantasia Bunko imprint on February 20, 2013. As of June 2016, eight volumes have been published. During their panel at Anime Expo 2018, J-Novel Club announced that they have licensed the light novel, with the first volume being released digitally on September 9, 2018.

A spin-off light novel series, written by Keishō Yanagawa and titled Amagi Brilliant Park: Maple Summoner, was published by Fujimi Fantasia Bunko from October 18, 2014, to February 20, 2015 in three volumes.

Manga
A manga adaptation with art by Kimitake Yoshioka started serialization in Fujimi Shobo's shōnen manga magazine Monthly Dragon Age with the March 2014 issue sold on February 8. The series has been compiled in two tankōbon volumes, released on June 7 and October 8, 2014. A four-panel comic strip manga illustrated by Kōji Azuma titled  began serialization in Monthly Dragon Age with the June 2014 issue.

Anime
A 13-episode anime television series adaptation produced by Kyoto Animation and directed by Yasuhiro Takemoto, with Fumihiko Shimo handling series composition, Miku Kadowaki designing the characters and Shinkichi Mitsumune composing the music. The series aired from October 6 to December 25, 2014. Akino and bless4 also did an English version of this song titled "Extra Magic Hour (International Edition)". Additionally, there is an original video animation episode bundled with the seventh volume of the DVD and Blu-ray discs, and seven mini-episode side stories titled Amagi Brilliant Park: Wakuwaku Mini Theater - Rakugaki Backstage that were also bundled with the DVD and Blu-ray volumes.

Sentai Filmworks has licensed the series in North America and the series in both Japanese and English dubs were released on home video in Blu-ray on February 28, 2017 with the series streamed on HIDIVE. Crunchyroll had previously streamed the series in North America in 2015. Following the acquisition of Crunchyroll by Sony Pictures Television, the parent company of Funimation in 2021, Amagi Brilliant Park'', among several Sentai titles, was dropped from the service on March 31, 2022.

References

External links
 
Amagi Brilliant Park at TBS 

2013 Japanese novels
2014 Japanese novels
Anime and manga based on light novels
Fantasy anime and manga
Fujimi Fantasia Bunko
Fujimi Shobo manga
J-Novel Club books
Japanese comedy novels
Japanese fantasy novels
Japanese romance novels
Japanese webcomics
Japanese-language novels
Kadokawa Dwango franchises
Kyoto Animation
Light novels
Madman Entertainment anime
Mainichi Broadcasting System original programming
Narcissism in fiction
Novels set in amusement parks
Romantic comedy anime and manga
Sentai Filmworks
Shōnen manga
Television shows based on light novels
TBS Television (Japan) original programming
Webcomics in print
Yonkoma